Brendan Cole (born 29 May 1981) is an Australian hurdler.  At the 2012 Summer Olympics, he competed in the Men's 400 metres hurdles and the Men's 4 × 400 metres relay.

Cole was a member of the Australian 4 × 400 metres relay team that won the gold medal at the 2010 Commonwealth Games in Dehli.

In 2012, Cole won the prestigious Burnie Gift, becoming the first athlete from Australia's capital city - Canberra, to win the Burnie Gift.

References

External links

Australian male hurdlers
Living people
Olympic athletes of Australia
Athletes (track and field) at the 2012 Summer Olympics
1981 births
World Athletics Championships athletes for Australia
Athletes (track and field) at the 2006 Commonwealth Games
Athletes (track and field) at the 2010 Commonwealth Games
Australian male sprinters
Commonwealth Games gold medallists for Australia
Commonwealth Games medallists in athletics
Universiade medalists in athletics (track and field)
ACT Academy of Sport alumni
Universiade gold medalists for Australia
Medalists at the 2009 Summer Universiade
Sportspeople from Canberra
People educated at Salesian College (Chadstone)
Medallists at the 2010 Commonwealth Games